Canton is an Italian Italo disco musical group formed in 1983. They entered the 1984 Sanremo Music Festival with the song "Sonnambulismo" (that they later remade in English as "Sleepwalking"), ranking fourth in the 'Nuove proposte' section. The song was a moderate commercial success. In 1985, the songs "Please Don't Stay" and "Stay With Me" (produced by Stock Aitken Waterman) became hits through European charts.

Personnel  
 Marcello "Marci" Semeraro - vocals (1983-1986, 2007–present)
 Francesco Marchetti - guitar (1983-1986, 2007–present)
 Stefano Valdo - bass (1983-1986)

Discography 
1984 - Please Don't Stay (Ariston Music)
1984 - Sleepwalking (Ariston Music)
1984 - Sonnambulismo (Telediscos)
1985 - Stay with me (Ariston Music)

References

External links
 
 

Musical groups established in 1983
Italian pop music groups
Italo disco groups
English-language singers from Italy
Musical groups from Milan